The United States Permanent Representative to the Organization for the Prohibition of Chemical Weapons (OPCW) has the rank of Ambassador and is based in The Hague, Netherlands, the seat of the OPCW. The current permanent representative is Joseph Manso.  Ambassador Manso was confirmed by the U.S. Senate in August 2020 and he presented his credentials to director-general Fernando Arias on September 23, 2020.

Previous permanent representatives:

 Donald A. Mahley was confirmed by the senate and served from 2000 until April 2002.
Eric M. Javits was confirmed by the senate in April 2003  and served until January 2009.  After Ambassador Javits's departure, Robert Mikulak became the United States Representative to the Executive Council in the absence of a permanent representative from January 2009 until November 2010.
 Robert Mikulak was confirmed by the senate in September 2010 and served until July 2015.  He presented his credentials on November 29, 2010 to director-general Üzümcü.
 Kenneth D. Ward was confirmed by the U.S. Senate in December 2015  and he presented his credentials to director-general Üzümcü on December 17, 2015.

See also
 Chemical Weapons Convention
 Organisation for the Prohibition of Chemical Weapons
 United States ambassador to the Netherlands

References

Organisation for the Prohibition of Chemical Weapons
United States of America